Isaac Andrew Owens AFM (7 November 1918 – 15 October 1998) was a Welsh rugby union, and professional rugby league footballer who played in the 1940s and 1950s.

Playing career

Rugby union
Owens, who was born in Pontycymer near Bridgend, originally played rugby union for Blaengarw RFC, before switching to Maesteg. Although switching to rugby league in 1943 Owens was part of the 1945 British Empire Forces rugby union team that played France, during a period when the strict guideline between amateur and professional were relaxed. Owens, playing at number eight, scored two tries in that game helping the British to a 27–6 victory.

Rugby league
Owens changed codes in 1943 and joined Leeds. He also played two games for Oldham RLFC (Heritage № 476) as a wartime guest.

His international début came in March 1945 when he won the first of 12 caps for Wales in an 18–8 defeat by England at Central Park, Wigan.

In 1946 he was selected for the Great Britain, and played in all four tests (three against Australia and one against New Zealand) on the tour to Australia and New Zealand scoring a try in the third test against Australia.1946 Great Britain Lions tour. Following his return from the tour there was speculation that Owens was going to move to Australia to play for Newtown but Owens turned the move down.

Owens played in one Challenge Cup final being on the losing side at Leeds lost 4–8 defeat by Bradford Northern in the 1946–47 Challenge Cup Final at Wembley Stadium, London on Saturday 3 May 1947.

Before the start of the 1948–49 season Owens asked for a transfer from Leeds and in October 1948 he signed for Castleford for a fee of £2,750. Owens only played seven games for Castleford before moving to Huddersfield in January 1949, again for a fee of £2,750.

During Owens' second season with Huddersfield (1949–50), the team reached both the Championship Final, and the final of the Yorkshire Cup but lost both; the Championship 2–20 to Wigan and the Cup to 4–11 to Bradford Northern.

At the end of the 1951–52 season Owens retired aged 33, and returned to Wales.

Wartime service
Ike Owens served in the Royal Air Force as a Parachute Jump Instructor during World War II at No. 1 Parachute Training School RAF based at RAF Ringway near Manchester. He was awarded the Air Force Medal in the 1945 Birthday Honours.

References

External links
!Great Britain Statistics at englandrl.co.uk (statistics currently missing due to not having appeared for both Great Britain, and England)

1918 births
1998 deaths
Castleford Tigers players
Footballers who switched code
Great Britain national rugby league team players
Huddersfield Giants players
Leeds Rhinos players
Maesteg RFC players
Oldham R.L.F.C. players
People from Pontycymer
Place of death missing
Recipients of the Air Force Medal
Royal Air Force airmen
Royal Air Force personnel of World War II
Royal Air Force rugby union players
Rugby league locks
Rugby league players from Bridgend County Borough
Rugby union players from Bridgend County Borough
Wales national rugby league team players
Welsh rugby league players
Welsh rugby union players